Eduardo Mario Acevedo Cardozo (born 25 September 1959) is a Uruguayan former footballer who played as a defender and manager. He obtained a total number of 41 international caps for the Uruguay national football team and was a member of the team that competed at the 1986 FIFA World Cup.

Career
Acevedo played club football for Defensor Sporting Club in Uruguay. After the 1986 World Cup, he played for Deportivo de La Coruña in Spain, Tecos UAG in Mexico, and Toshiba in Japan.

Acevedo returned to Uruguay in 1993 to play for C.A. Fenix; he then had short spells with C.A. Rentistas and Sud América.

References

External links

  Official site

1959 births
Living people
Footballers from Montevideo
Association football defenders
Uruguayan footballers
Uruguay international footballers
1983 Copa América players
1986 FIFA World Cup players
Copa América-winning players
Defensor Sporting players
Deportivo de La Coruña players
Tecos F.C. footballers
Hokkaido Consadole Sapporo players
Centro Atlético Fénix players
C.A. Rentistas players
Sud América players
Uruguayan expatriate footballers
Uruguayan expatriate sportspeople in Japan
Uruguayan expatriate sportspeople in Mexico
Uruguayan expatriate sportspeople in Spain
Expatriate footballers in Japan
Expatriate footballers in Mexico
Expatriate footballers in Spain
Uruguayan Primera División players
Segunda División players
Liga MX players
Uruguayan football managers
Deportivo Maldonado managers
C.A. Cerro managers
Club Atlético Banfield managers
Tecos F.C. managers
Atlético Morelia managers
Defensor Sporting managers
Universidad de Concepción managers
Expatriate football managers in Chile
Expatriate football managers in Mexico
Expatriate football managers in Argentina